Collins Township is an inactive township in St. Clair County, in the U.S. state of Missouri.

Collins Township was erected in 1872, taking its name from William Collins, a local judge.

References

Townships in Missouri
Townships in St. Clair County, Missouri